Council of Elders may refer to:

 Council of Elders (Malaysia), a group of eminent Malaysians advising the current Malaysian government
 Council of Elders (A Series of Unfortunate Events), a fictional organization
 Council of Elders of the Bundestag (Germany), a joint deliberative body
 Council of Five Elders, a form of government in feudal Japan
 Council of Ancients, the upper house of the French Directory, a.k.a. Council of Elders
 Teip Council of Elders, a council within the Chechen tribal organization Teip
 Roman Senate, from the Latin "senatus" meaning "council of elders"
 The privy council in several African kingdoms, such as the Oyo Mesi
 The ruling council of the planet Krypton in the Superman comic book and film series

See also
 Elder (disambiguation)
 Eldership (disambiguation)
 COE (disambiguation)
 House of Elders (disambiguation)